The 33rd United States Congress was a meeting of the legislative branch of the United States federal government, consisting of the United States Senate and the United States House of Representatives. It met in Washington, D.C. from March 4, 1853, to March 4, 1855, during the first two years of Franklin Pierce's presidency. During this session, the Kansas–Nebraska Act was passed, an act that soon led to the creation of the Republican Party. The apportionment of seats in the House of Representatives was based on the 1850 United States census. Both chambers had a Democratic majority.

Major events 

 March 4, 1853: Franklin Pierce became 14th President of the United States
 April 18, 1853: Vice President William R. King died
 July 8, 1853: Commodore Matthew C. Perry arrived in Edo Bay with a request for a trade treaty
 December 30, 1853: Gadsden Purchase: The United States bought land from Mexico to facilitate railroad building in the Southwest
 March 20, 1854: Republican Party founded

Major legislation 

 May 30, 1854: Kansas–Nebraska Act, ch. 59, 
 March 3, 1855: The U.S. Congress appropriates $30,000 to create the U.S. Camel Corps

Treaties 
 January 26, 1854: Point No Point Treaty signed
 March 31, 1854: Convention of Kanagawa signed with the Japanese government, opening the ports of Shimoda and Hakodate to American trade

Territories organized 
 May 30, 1854 – Kansas Territory was organized.
 May 30, 1854 – Nebraska Territory was organized.

Party summary

Senate

House of Representatives 
For the beginning of this congress, the size of the House was increased from 233 seats to 234 seats, following the 1850 United States Census (See ).

Leadership

Senate 
 President: William R. King (D), until April 18, 1853; vacant thereafter.
 President pro tempore: David R. Atchison (D), until December 4, 1854
 Lewis Cass (D), December 4, 1854
 Jesse D. Bright (D), from December 5, 1854

House of Representatives 
 Speaker: Linn Boyd (D)
 Democratic Caucus Chairman: Edson B. Olds

Members 
This list is arranged by chamber, then by state. Senators are listed by class, and representatives are listed by district.

Senate 
Senators were elected by the state legislatures every two years, with one-third beginning new six-year terms with each Congress. Preceding the names in the list below are Senate class numbers, which indicate the cycle of their election. In this Congress, Class 1 meant their term began in the last Congress, requiring re-election in 1856; Class 2 meant their term began with this Congress, requiring re-election in 1858; and Class 3 meant their term ended with this Congress, requiring re-election in 1854. The United States consisted of 31 states during this Congress.
Skip to House of Representatives, below

Alabama 
 2. Clement C. Clay Jr. (D), from November 29, 1853
 3. Benjamin Fitzpatrick (D)

Arkansas 
 2. William K. Sebastian (D)
 3. Solon Borland (D), until April 11, 1853
 Robert W. Johnson (D), from July 6, 1853

California 
 1. John B. Weller (D)
 3. William M. Gwin (D)

Connecticut 
 1. Isaac Toucey (D)
 3. Truman Smith (W), until May 24, 1854
 Francis Gillette (FS), from May 24, 1854

Delaware 
 1. James A. Bayard Jr. (D)
 2. John M. Clayton (W)

Florida 
 1. Stephen Mallory (D)
 3. Jackson Morton (W)

Georgia 
 2. Robert Toombs (D)
 3. William C. Dawson (W)

Illinois 
 2. Stephen A. Douglas (D)
 3. James Shields (D)

Indiana 
 1. Jesse D. Bright (D)
 3. John Pettit (D)

Iowa 
 2. George Wallace Jones (D)
 3. Augustus C. Dodge (D), until February 22, 1855

Kentucky 
 2. John B. Thompson (A)
 3. Archibald Dixon (W)

Louisiana 
 2. Judah P. Benjamin (W)
 3. Pierre Soulé (D), until April 11, 1853
 John Slidell (D), from December 5, 1853

Maine 
 1. Hannibal Hamlin (D)
 2. William Pitt Fessenden (W), from February 10, 1854

Maryland 
 1. Thomas Pratt (W)
 3. James Pearce (W)

Massachusetts 
 1. Charles Sumner (FS)
 2. Edward Everett (W), until June 1, 1854
 Julius Rockwell (W), from June 3, 1854, until January 31, 1855
 Henry Wilson (FS), from January 31, 1855

Michigan 
 1. Lewis Cass (D)
 2. Charles E. Stuart (D)

Mississippi 
 1. Stephen Adams (D)
 2. Albert G. Brown (D), from January 7, 1854

Missouri 
 1. Henry S. Geyer (W)
 3. David R. Atchison (D)

New Hampshire 
 2. Charles G. Atherton (D), until November 15, 1853
 Jared W. Williams (D), from November 29, 1853, until July 15, 1854
 3. Moses Norris Jr. (D), until January 11, 1855
 John S. Wells (D), from January 16, 1855

New Jersey 
 1. John R. Thomson (D)
 2. William Wright (D)

New York 
 1. Hamilton Fish (W)
 3. William H. Seward (W)

North Carolina 
 2. David S. Reid (D), from December 6, 1854
 3. George E. Badger (W)

Ohio 
 1. Benjamin Wade (W)
 3. Salmon P. Chase (FS)

Pennsylvania 
 1. Richard Brodhead (D)
 3. James Cooper (W)

Rhode Island 
 1. Charles T. James (D)
 2. Philip Allen (D), from July 20, 1853

South Carolina 
 2. Josiah J. Evans (D)
 3. Andrew Butler (D)

Tennessee 
 1. James C. Jones (W)
 2. John Bell (W)

Texas 
 1. Thomas J. Rusk (D)
 2. Samuel Houston (D)

Vermont 
 1. Solomon Foot (W)
 3. Samuel S. Phelps (W), until March 16, 1854
 Lawrence Brainerd (FS), from October 14, 1854

Virginia 
 1. James M. Mason (D)
 2. Robert M. T. Hunter (D)

Wisconsin 
 1. Henry Dodge (D)
 3. Isaac P. Walker (D)

House of Representatives 
The names of members of the House of Representatives are preceded by their district numbers.

Alabama 
 . Philip Phillips (D)
 . James Abercrombie (W)
 . Sampson W. Harris (D)
 . William R. Smith (D)
 . George S. Houston (D)
 . Williamson R. W. Cobb (D)
 . James F. Dowdell (D)

Arkansas 
 . Alfred B. Greenwood (D)
 . Edward A. Warren (D)

California 
Both representatives were elected statewide on a general ticket.
 . Milton Latham (D)
 . James A. McDougall (D)

Connecticut 
 . James T. Pratt (D)
 . Colin M. Ingersoll (D)
 . Nathan Belcher (D)
 . Origen S. Seymour (D)

Delaware 
 . George Read Riddle (D)

Florida 
 . Augustus Maxwell (D)

Georgia 
 . James L. Seward (D)
 . Alfred H. Colquitt (D)
 . David J. Bailey (D)
 . William B. W. Dent (D)
 . Elijah W. Chastain (D)
 . Junius Hillyer (D)
 . David A. Reese (W)
 . Alexander Stephens (W)

Illinois 
 . Elihu B. Washburne (W)
 . John Wentworth (D)
 . Jesse O. Norton (W)
 . James Knox (W)
 . William A. Richardson (D)
 . Richard Yates (W)
 . James C. Allen (D)
 . William H. Bissell (ID)
 . Willis Allen (D)

Indiana 
 . Smith Miller (D)
 . William H. English (D)
 . Cyrus L. Dunham (D)
 . James H. Lane (D)
 . Samuel W. Parker (W)
 . Thomas A. Hendricks (D)
 . John G. Davis (D)
 . Daniel Mace (D)
 . Norman Eddy (D)
 . Ebenezer M. Chamberlain (D)
 . Andrew J. Harlan (D)

Iowa 
 . Bernhart Henn (D)
 . John P. Cook (W)

Kentucky 
 . Linn Boyd (D)
 . Benjamin E. Grey (W)
 . Presley Ewing (W), until September 27, 1854
 Francis Bristow (W), from December 4, 1854
 . James Chrisman (D)
 . Clement S. Hill (W)
 . John M. Elliott (D)
 . William Preston (W)
 . John C. Breckinridge (D)
 . Leander Cox (W)
 . Richard H. Stanton (D)

Louisiana 
 . William Dunbar (D)
 . Theodore G. Hunt (W)
 . John Perkins Jr. (D)
 . Roland Jones (D)

Maine 
 . Moses MacDonald (D)
 . Samuel Mayall (D)
 . E. Wilder Farley (W)
 . Samuel P. Benson (W)
 . Israel Washburn Jr. (W)
 . Thomas J. D. Fuller (D)

Maryland 
 . John R. Franklin (W)
 . Jacob Shower (D)
 . Joshua Van Sant (D)
 . Henry May (D)
 . William T. Hamilton (D)
 . Augustus R. Sollers (W)

Massachusetts 
 . Zeno Scudder (W), until March 4, 1854
 Thomas D. Eliot (W), from April 17, 1854
 . Samuel L. Crocker (W)
 . J. Wiley Edmands (W)
 . Samuel H. Walley (W)
 . William Appleton (W)
 . Charles W. Upham (W)
 . Nathaniel P. Banks (D)
 . Tappan Wentworth (W)
 . Alexander De Witt (FS)
 . Edward Dickinson (W)
 . John Z. Goodrich (W)

Michigan 
 . David Stuart (D)
 . David A. Noble (D)
 . Samuel Clark (D)
 . Hestor L. Stevens (D)

Mississippi 
 . Daniel B. Wright (D)
 . William T. S. Barry (D)
 . Otho R. Singleton (D)
 . Wiley P. Harris (D)
 . William Barksdale (D)

Missouri 
 . Thomas H. Benton (D)
 . Alfred W. Lamb (D)
 . James J. Lindley (W)
 . Mordecai Oliver (W)
 . John G. Miller (W)
 . John S. Phelps (D)
 . Samuel Caruthers (W)

New Hampshire 
 . George W. Kittredge (D)
 . George W. Morrison (D)
 . Harry Hibbard (D)

New Jersey 
 . Nathan T. Stratton (D)
 . Charles Skelton (D)
 . Samuel Lilly (D)
 . George Vail (D)
 . Alexander C. M. Pennington (W)

New York 
 . James Maurice (D)
 . Thomas W. Cumming (D)
 . Hiram Walbridge (D)
 . Michael Walsh (D)
 . William M. Tweed (D)
 . John Wheeler (D)
 . William A. Walker (D)
 . Francis B. Cutting (D)
 . Jared V. Peck (D)
 . William Murray (D)
 . Theodoric R. Westbrook (D)
 . Gilbert Dean (D), until July 3, 1854
 Isaac Teller (W), from November 7, 1854
 . Russell Sage (W)
 . Rufus W. Peckham (D)
 . Charles Hughes (D)
 . George A. Simmons (W)
 . Bishop Perkins (D)
 . Peter Rowe (D)
 . George W. Chase (W)
 . Orsamus B. Matteson (W)
 . Henry Bennett (W)
 . Gerrit Smith (FS), until August 7, 1854
 Henry C. Goodwin (W), from November 7, 1854
 . Caleb Lyon (I)
 . Daniel T. Jones (D)
 . Edwin B. Morgan (W)
 . Andrew Oliver (D)
 . John J. Taylor (D)
 . George Hastings (D)
 . Azariah Boody (W) until October 13, 1853
 Davis Carpenter (W), from November 8, 1853
 . Benjamin Pringle (W)
 . Thomas T. Flagler (W)
 . Solomon G. Haven (W)
 . Reuben Fenton (D)

North Carolina 
 . Henry M. Shaw (D)
 . Thomas H. Ruffin (D)
 . William S. Ashe (D)
 . Sion H. Rogers (W)
 . John Kerr Jr. (W)
 . Richard C. Puryear (W)
 . F. Burton Craige (D)
 . Thomas L. Clingman (D)

Ohio 
 . David T. Disney (D)
 . John Scott Harrison (W)
 . Lewis D. Campbell (W)
 . Matthias H. Nichols (D)
 . Alfred P. Edgerton (D)
 . Andrew Ellison (D)
 . Aaron Harlan (W)
 . Moses B. Corwin (W)
 . Frederick W. Green (D)
 . John L. Taylor (W)
 . Thomas Ritchey (D)
 . Edson B. Olds (D)
 . William D. Lindsley (D)
 . Harvey H. Johnson (D)
 . William R. Sapp (W)
 . Edward Ball (W)
 . Wilson Shannon (D)
 . George Bliss (D)
 . Edward Wade (FS)
 . Joshua R. Giddings (FS)
 . Andrew Stuart (D)

Pennsylvania 
 . Thomas B. Florence (D)
 . Joseph R. Chandler (W)
 . John Robbins Jr. (D)
 . William H. Witte (D)
 . John McNair (D)
 . William Everhart (W)
 . Samuel A. Bridges (D)
 . Henry A. Muhlenberg (D), until January 9, 1854
 J. Glancey Jones (D), from February 4, 1854
 . Isaac E. Hiester (W)
 . Ner A. Middleswarth (W)
 . Christian M. Straub (D)
 . Hendrick B. Wright (D)
 . Asa Packer (D)
 . Galusha A. Grow (D)
 . James Gamble (D)
 . William H. Kurtz (D)
 . Samuel L. Russell (W)
 . John McCulloch (W)
 . Augustus Drum (D)
 . John L. Dawson (D)
 . David Ritchie (W)
 . Thomas M. Howe (W)
 . Michael C. Trout (D)
 . Carlton B. Curtis (D)
 . John Dick (W)

Rhode Island 
 . Thomas Davis (D)
 . Benjamin B. Thurston (D)

South Carolina 
 . John McQueen (D)
 . William Aiken Jr. (D)
 . Laurence M. Keitt (D)
 . Preston Brooks (D)
 . James L. Orr (D)
 . William W. Boyce (D)

Tennessee 
 . Brookins Campbell (D), until December 25, 1853
 Nathaniel G. Taylor (W), from March 30, 1854
 . William M. Churchwell (D)
 . Samuel A. Smith (D)
 . William Cullom (W)
 . Charles Ready (W)
 . George W. Jones (D)
 . Robert M. Bugg (W)
 . Felix K. Zollicoffer (W)
 . Emerson Etheridge (W)
 . Frederick P. Stanton (D)

Texas 
 . George W. Smyth (D)
 . Peter H. Bell (D)

Vermont 
 . James Meacham (W)
 . Andrew Tracy (W)
 . Alvah Sabin (W)

Virginia 
 . Thomas H. Bayly (D)
 . John S. Millson (D)
 . John Caskie (D)
 . William Goode (D)
 . Thomas S. Bocock (D)
 . Paulus Powell (D)
 . William Smith (D)
 . Charles J. Faulkner (D)
 . John Letcher (D)
 . Zedekiah Kidwell (D)
 . John F. Snodgrass (D), until June 5, 1854
 Charles S. Lewis (D), from December 4, 1854
 . Henry A. Edmundson (D)
 . LaFayette McMullen (D)

Wisconsin 
 . Daniel Wells Jr. (D)
 . Ben C. Eastman (D)
 . John B. Macy (D)

Non-voting members 
 . John W. Whitfield (D), from December 20, 1854
 . Henry M. Rice (D)
 . Napoleon B. Giddings (D), from January 5, 1855
 . José Manuel Gallegos (D)
 . Joseph Lane (D)
 . John M. Bernhisel
 . Columbia Lancaster (D), from April 12, 1854

Changes in membership 

The count below reflects changes from the beginning of the first session of this Congress.

Senate 
 Replacements: 7
 Democrats (D): 2 seat net gain
 Whigs (W): 2 seat net loss
 Free Soilers (FS): 3 seat net gain 
 Deaths: 2
 Resignations: 4
 Interim appointments: 1
 Total seats with changes: 13

|-
| Rhode Island(2)
| Vacant
| Failure to elect.Successor was elected July 20, 1853.
|  | Philip Allen (D)
| July 20, 1853

|-
| Alabama(2)
| Vacant
| Failure to elect.Successor elected November 29, 1853.
|  | Clement C. Clay (D)
| November 29, 1853

|-
| Mississippi(2)
| Vacant
| Failure to elect.Successor elected January 7, 1854.
|  | Albert G. Brown (D)
| January 7, 1854

|-
| Maine(2)
| Vacant
| Failure to elect.Successor was elected February 10, 1854.
|  | William P. Fessenden (W)
| February 10, 1854

|-
| North Carolina(2)
| Vacant
| Failure to elect.Successor was elected December 6, 1854.
|  | David Reid (D)
| December 6, 1854

|-
| Arkansas(3)
|  | Solon Borland (D)
| Resigned April 11, 1853, after being appointed U.S. Minister to Nicaragua and other Central American Republics.Successor appointed July 6, 1853.
|  | Robert W. Johnson (D)
| July 6, 1853

|-
| Louisiana(3)
|  | Pierre Soulé (D)
| Resigned April 11, 1853, after being appointed U.S. Minister to Spain.Successor elected December 5, 1853.
|  | John Slidell (D)
| December 5, 1853

|-
| New Hampshire(2)
|  | Charles G. Atherton (D)
| Died November 15, 1853.
|  | Jared W. Williams (D)
| November 29, 1853

|-
| Vermont(3)
|  | Samuel S. Phelps (W)
| Senate declared not entitled to seat March 16, 1854.Successor elected October 14, 1854.
|  | Lawrence Brainerd (FS)
| October 14, 1854

|-
| Connecticut(3)
|  | Truman Smith (W)
| Resigned May 24, 1854.Successor was elected May 24, 1854.
|  | Francis Gillette (FS)
| May 24, 1854

|-
| Massachusetts(2)
|  | Edward Everett (W)
| Resigned June 1, 1854Successor was appointed to serve until a new successor was elected.
|  | Julius Rockwell (W)
| June 3, 1854

|-
| New Hampshire(2)
|  | Jared W. Williams (D)
| Resigned August 4, 1854.
| Vacant
| Not filled this term

|-
| New Hampshire(3)
|  | Moses Norris Jr. (D)
| Died January 11, 1855.Successor appointed January 16, 1855, to finish the term.
|  | John S. Wells (D)
| January 16, 1855

|-
| Massachusetts(2)
|  | Julius Rockwell (W)
| Successor elected January 31, 1855.
|  | Henry Wilson (FS) 
| January 31, 1855

|-
| Iowa(3)
|  | Augustus C. Dodge (D)
| Resigned February 22, 1855, after being appointed U.S. Minister to Spain.
| Vacant
| Not filled this term
|}

House of Representatives 
 Replacements: 7
 Democrats (D): 2 seat net loss
 Whigs (W): 3 seat net gain
 Free Soilers (FS): 1 seat net loss
 Deaths: 4
 Resignations: 4
 Total seats with changes: 8

|-
| 
| Vacant
| style="font-size:80%" | New seat established after Washington became a territory near the end of previous Congress.  Seat was vacant until April 12, 1854.
|  | Columbia Lancaster (D)
| Seated April 12, 1854
|-
| 
|  | Azariah Boody (W)
| style="font-size:80%" | Resigned on October 13, 1853
|  | Davis Carpenter (W)
| Seated November 8, 1853
|-
| 
|  | Brookins Campbell (D)
| style="font-size:80%" | Died December 25, 1853
|  | Nathaniel G. Taylor (W)
| Seated March 30, 1854
|-
| 
|  | Henry A. Muhlenberg (D)
| style="font-size:80%" | Died January 9, 1854
|  | J. Glancy Jones (D)
| Seated February 4, 1854
|-
| 
|  | Zeno Scudder (W)
| style="font-size:80%" | Resigned March 4, 1854
|  | Thomas D. Eliot (W)
| Seated April 17, 1854
|-
| 
| New seat
| style="font-size:80%" | New seat established after Kansas became a territory May 30, 1854.  Seat was vacant until December 20, 1854.
|  | John W. Whitfield (D)
| Seated December 20, 1854
|-
| 
| New seat
| style="font-size:80%" | New seat established after Nebraska became a territory May 30, 1854.  Seat was vacant until January 5, 1855.
|  | Napoleon B. Giddings (D)
| Seated December 5, 1855
|-
| 
|  | John F. Snodgrass (D)
| style="font-size:80%" | Died June 5, 1854
|  | Charles S. Lewis (D)
| Seated December 4, 1854
|-
| 
|  | Gilbert Dean (D)
| style="font-size:80%" | Resigned July 3, 1854, after being appointed justice of the Supreme Court of New York
|  | Isaac Teller (W)
| Seated November 7, 1854
|-
| 
|  | Gerrit Smith (W)
| style="font-size:80%" | Resigned August 7, 1854
|  | Henry C. Goodwin (W)
| Seated November 7, 1854
|-
| 
|  | Presley Ewing (W)
| style="font-size:80%" | Died September 27, 1854
|  | Francis Bristow (W)
| Seated December 4, 1854
|}

Committees 
List of committees and their party leaders.

Senate 
 Agriculture (Chairman: Philip Allen)
 American Association for the Promotion of Science (Select)
 Atmospheric Telegraph Between Washington and Baltimore (Select)
 Audit and Control the Contingent Expenses of the Senate (Chairman: Josiah J. Evans)
 Claims (Chairman: Richard Brodhead)
 Commerce (Chairman: Hannibal Hamlin)
 Distributing Public Revenue Among the States (Select)
 District of Columbia (Chairman: Moses Norris Jr.)
 Engrossed Bills (Chairman: Benjamin Fitzpatrick)
 Finance (Chairman: Robert M.T. Hunter)
 Foreign Relations (Chairman: James M. Mason)
 French Spoilations (Select)
 Indian Affairs (Chairman: William K. Sebastian)
 Judiciary (Chairman: Andrew P. Butler)
 Library (Chairman: James A. Pearce)
 Loss of Original Papers of Mark and Richard Bean (Select)
 Manufactures (Chairman: Hannibal Hamlin)
 Mexican Claims Commission (Select)
 Military Affairs (Chairman: James Shields)
 Militia (Chairman: Sam Houston)
 Naval Affairs (Chairman: William M. Gwin)
 Ordnance and War Ships (Select)
 Pacific Railroad (Select) (Chairman: William M. Gwin)
 Patents and the Patent Office (Chairman: Charles T. James)
 Pensions (Chairman: George Wallace Jones)
 Post Office and Post Roads (Chairman: Thomas J. Rusk)
 Printing (Chairman: Benjamin Fitzpatrick)
 Private Claims Commission (Select)
 Private Land Claims (Chairman: John Pettit)
 Protection of Life and Health in Passenger Ships (Select)
 Public Buildings and Grounds (Chairman: James A. Bayard Jr.)
 Public Lands (Chairman: Augustus Dodge)
 Retrenchment (Chairman: Stephen Adams)
 Revolutionary Claims (Chairman: Isaac P. Walker)
 Roads and Canals (Chairman: John Slidell)
 Sickness on Emigrant Ships (Select)
 Tariff Regulation (Select)
 Territories (Chairman: Stephen A. Douglas)
 Whole

House of Representatives 
 Accounts (Chairman: Carlton B. Curtis)
 Agriculture (Chairman: John L. Dawson)
 Claims (Chairman: Alfred P. Edgerton)
 Commerce (Chairman: Frederick P. Stanton)
 District of Columbia (Chairman: William T. Hamilton)
 Elections (Chairman: Richard H. Stanton)
 Engraving (Chairman: George R. Riddle)
 Expenditures in the Navy Department (Chairman: Fayette McMullen)
 Expenditures in the Post Office Department (Chairman: Samuel Lilly)
 Expenditures in the State Department (Chairman: Daniel Wells Jr.)
 Expenditures in the Treasury Department (Chairman: David Stuart)
 Expenditures in the War Department (Chairman: George W. Kittredge)
 Expenditures on Public Buildings (Chairman: Henry A. Edmundson)
 Foreign Affairs (Chairman: Thomas H. Bayly)
 Indian Affairs (Chairman: James L. Orr)
 Invalid Pensions (Chairman: Thomas A. Hendricks)
 Judiciary (Chairman: Frederick P. Stanton)
 Manufactures (Chairman: John McNair)
 Mileage (Chairman: Andrew J. Harlan)
 Military Affairs (Chairman: William H. Bissell)
 Militia (Chairman: Elijah W. Chastain)
 Naval Affairs (Chairman: Thomas S. Bocock)
 Patents (Chairman: Benjamin B. Thurston)
 Post Office and Post Roads (Chairman: Edson B. Olds)
 Private Land Claims (Chairman: Junius Hillyer)
 Public Buildings and Grounds (Chairman: Francis B. Craige)
 Public Expenditures (Chairman: William H. Kurtz)
 Public Lands (Chairman: David T. Disney)
 Revisal and Unfinished Business (Chairman: Williamson R. W. Cobb) 
 Revolutionary Claims (Chairman: Rufus W. Peckham)
 Revolutionary Pensions (Chairman: William M. Churchwell)
 Roads and Canals (Chairman: Cyrus L. Dunham)
 Rules (Select)
 Standards of Official Conduct
 Territories (Chairman: William A. Richardson)
 Ways and Means (Chairman: George S. Houston)
 Whole

Joint committees 
 Amending the Constitution on Presidential and Vice Presidential Elections
 Enrolled Bills (Chairman: Sen. George Wallace Jones)
 The Library (Chairman: Joseph R. Chandler)
 Printing (Chairman: William Murray)
 San Francisco Disaster

Caucuses 
 Democratic (House)
 Democratic (Senate)

Employees

Legislative branch agency directors 
 Architect of the Capitol: Thomas U. Walter
 Librarian of Congress: John Silva Meehan

Senate 
 Chaplain: Clement M. Butler (Episcopalian), until December 7, 1853
 Henry Slicer (Methodist), elected December 7, 1853
 Secretary: Asbury Dickins 
 Sergeant at Arms: Robert Beale, until March 17, 1853
 Dunning R. McNair, elected March 17, 1853

House of Representatives 
 Chaplain: William H. Milburn (Methodist)
 Clerk: John W. Forney
 Doorkeeper: Zadock W. McKnew
 Postmaster: John M. Johnson
 Reading Clerks: 
 Sergeant at Arms: Adam J. Glossbrenner

See also 
 1852 United States elections (elections leading to this Congress)
 1852 United States presidential election
 1852–53 United States Senate elections
 1852–53 United States House of Representatives elections
 1854 United States elections (elections during this Congress, leading to the next Congress)
 1854–55 United States Senate elections
 1854–55 United States House of Representatives elections

Notes

References

External links 
 Statutes at Large, 1789–1875
 Senate Journal, First Forty-three Sessions of Congress
 House Journal, First Forty-three Sessions of Congress
 Biographical Directory of the U.S. Congress
 U.S. House of Representatives: House History
 U.S. Senate: Statistics and Lists